Republic is an unincorporated community and census-designated place (CDP) in Fayette County, Pennsylvania, United States. The population was 1,096 at the 2010 census, down from 1,396 at the 2000 census. The community is in Redstone Township.

Geography
Republic is located in western Fayette County at  (39.965531, -79.878064), on the western edge of Redstone Township. It is bordered to the west across Dunlap Creek by Luzerne Township.

Pennsylvania Route 166 passes through Republic, leading north  to Brownsville and south  to Edenborn.

Demographics
As of the census of 2000, there were 1,396 people, 614 households, and 359 families residing in the CDP. The population density was 1,887.4 people per square mile (728.4/km). There were 714 housing units at an average density of 965.3/sq mi (372.5/km). The racial makeup of the CDP was 90.47% White, 7.02% African American, 0.29% Native American, 0.36% from other races, and 1.86% from two or more races. Hispanic or Latino of any race were 0.43% of the population.

There were 614 households, out of which 24.8% had children under the age of 18 living with them, 38.9% were married couples living together, 15.0% had a female householder with no husband present, and 41.5% were non-families. 37.6% of all households were made up of individuals, and 22.6% had someone living alone who was 65 years of age or older. The average household size was 2.27 and the average family size was 3.03.

In the CDP, the population was spread out, with 23.4% under the age of 18, 7.8% from 18 to 24, 25.6% from 25 to 44, 21.7% from 45 to 64, and 21.5% who were 65 years of age or older. The median age was 40 years. For every 100 females, there were 82.7 males. For every 100 females age 18 and over, there were 83.0 males.

The median income for a household in the CDP was $20,598, and the median income for a family was $26,411. Males had a median income of $37,813 versus $19,653 for females. The per capita income for the CDP was $14,201. About 20.4% of families and 22.9% of the population were below the poverty line, including 28.4% of those under age 18 and 14.2% of those age 65 or over.

Notable person
Vinnie Colaiuta, world-renowned session drummer and soloist; raised in Republic

References

Pittsburgh metropolitan area
Census-designated places in Fayette County, Pennsylvania
Census-designated places in Pennsylvania